Niranjan Shetty is an Indian actor who predominantly works in Kannada cinema. He is known for his acting in movies including Jolly Days and Case No. 18/9.

Early life
Niranjan Shetty was born to Bhaskar Shetty and Sukalatha Shetty in Gulvadi Village of Kundapura , Karnataka. Niranjan finished his schooling in his Native Cherkadi, Udupi and completed his bachelor's degree and Masters in Fine Arts Bangalore.

Personal life
On 19 December 2011 Niranjan married to Nagaveni Shetty. They have a daughter.

Career
Niranjan Shetty started his acting career through Kannada Serials. He has worked in 'Naagarika', 'Gupta Gamini', 'Papa Pandu', 'Prema Pishachigalu', and other serials.

Later Niranjan started working as an assistant with V. Manohar by which he could make his entry to Kannada cinema from Soap operas. He began as a supporting artist in his cinema journey. In the year 1999  Niranjan played a role of supporting artist in actor Sudeep's ever hit movie Sparsha. Subsequently, he played the part of supporting artist in major hit films like Thuntata, Rishi, Anandam, Aakash, Namma Basava, Milana etc.

In the year 2009 Nirajan Shetty Made his debut as a lead in the Kannada movie Jolly Days, which became a great breakthrough for him as a lead role. He acted as a Male Lead in the movie Case No. 18/9 Directed by Mahesh Rao. These two movies gave Niranjan a great breakthrough in his acting career.

Filmography

Awards and nominations
Nominated for the role of Best Male Debutant at 3rd SIIMA Awards for Case No. 18/9

References

External links
 

1980 births
Living people
Indian male film actors
21st-century Indian male actors